Sipalay, officially the City of Sipalay, is a 4th class component city in the province of Negros Occidental, Philippines. According to the 2020 census, it has a population of 72,448 people. It is the top tourist destination in the province of Negros Occidental.

History
Sipalay history can be traced back to the undated time of early settlements of the native Tumandok who discovered the lowland plains very fertile, arable and fully vegetated by trees. The areas was well dissected by river tributaries, which accounted for the fertility of the lowland.

During the Spanish era, the area was further discovered and developed by sailing adventurers from the neighboring island of Panay, being the group who resented the Kintos System enacted by the ruling Spaniards by then.

Growth and development flourished as Chinese merchants came to barter their wares with staple food, particularly rice, which was commonly called by the settlers as paray and by the Chinese, due to the difficulty of pronouncing r, as palay which was the word to have been popularly associated with the place. Thus the area came to be known as Sipalay.

At the advent of the American regime, Sipalay was a full pledge barrio of the Municipality of Cauayan. In the early 1920s the political structure was already in place.

During the World War II, Sipalay was made an emergency town and after the war. On November 20, 1948, then President Elpidio Quirino signed Executive Order No. 185 proclaiming Sipalay as a town. The official inauguration of the town was on December 20, 1948.

Cityhood

The conversion of Sipalay into a component city of the Province of Negros Occidental followed in 2001 after the ratification of Republic Act No. 9027.

Geography
Public utility vehicles plying the southern Negros route pass by this city. Those coming from Negros Oriental can either exit through Kabankalan City via Mabinay or through Dumaguete via Hinoba-an.

Barangays
Sipalay City is politically subdivided into 17 barangays.

 Barangay 1 (Poblacion)
 Barangay 2 (Poblacion)
 Barangay 3 (Poblacion)
 Barangay 4 (Poblacion)
 Barangay 5 (Poblacion)
 Cabadiangan
 Camindangan
 Canturay
 Cartagena
 Cayhagan
 Gil Montilla
 Mambaroto
 Manlucahoc
 Maricalum
 Nabulao
 Nauhang
 San Jose

Climate

Demographics

Major languages are Hiligaynon, followed by Cebuano with English and Tagalog being used as second languages.

Economy

Infrastructure

Transportation

Airline company Air Juan offers services from Cebu, Iloilo and Puerto Princesa via the Sipalay Airport.

Tourism

The city is known for its tourist destinations. An example of it is the now-defunct Maricalum Mining Corporation which happens to be one of the largest mining companies in the country. It now has a park dedicated for viewing the whole mine from atop.

It also boasts beautiful pristine beaches being a seaside city. Widely dubbed as the uncommercialized New Boracay of Negros, foreign and local tourists flock its beaches the whole year round not only for swimming but for diving as well.

References

External links

 
 [ Philippine Standard Geographic Code]
Philippine Census Information
Local Governance Performance Management System

Cities in Negros Occidental
Component cities in the Philippines
Establishments by Philippine executive order